Avindu Theekshana (born 10 October 1998) is a Sri Lankan cricketer. He made his first-class debut for Tamil Union Cricket and Athletic Club in the 2018–19 Premier League Tournament on 11 January 2019. He made his List A debut on 14 December 2019, for Kurunegala Youth Cricket Club in the 2019–20 Invitation Limited Over Tournament. He made his Twenty20 debut on 4 January 2020, for Kurunegala Youth Cricket Club in the 2019–20 SLC Twenty20 Tournament.

References

External links
 

1998 births
Living people
Sri Lankan cricketers
Kurunegala Youth Cricket Club cricketers
Tamil Union Cricket and Athletic Club cricketers
Place of birth missing (living people)